M. Sukumar is an Indian cinematographer, who has worked in the Telugu, Tamil, Hindi and Malayalam language films.

Career
Sukumar began his career in 1995 by assisting his brother M. Jeevan, who had then, broken into the Tamil film industry as a photographer. While studying for his degree in agriculture, Sukumar stepped in to assist Jeevan for a shoot of Rajiv Menon's Minsara Kanavu (1997). He subsequently continued working as an assistant photographer in films including Minnale (2001), Samurai (2002) and King (2002) and struck up a good relationship with the lead actor Vikram. His association with Vikram later led to him being offered the role as the main photographer for the actor's films including Dhool (2003) and Majaa (2005). While launching Kokki (2006), director Prabhu Solomon asked Sukumar to make his first foray into cinematography but his reluctance meant that his brother Jeevan, was handed the opportunity. Towards the end of the shoot, Jeevan became busy with other projects and Sukumar was brought in to work on a few portions in the film, including a song shoot in Chalakudi.

After Kokki, he worked on other Prabhu Solomon films including Laadam (2009), Mynaa (2010) and Kumki (2012), the latter two, winning him acclaim and fetching him opportunities to work in big budget ventures. Critics described his work as "spellbinding", and both films became critical and commercial successes. His work in Maan Karate and Nimirndhu Nil (2014), meant that he was unable to continue working with Solomon in Kayal (2012). AR Murugadoss also picked Sukumar to work on a single song in his Hindi action film Holiday (2014), during a shoot in Rajasthan. THAEN movie beautiful cinematography.  Super sir...

Filmography

As cinematographer

References

External links
 

Living people
Artists from Madurai
Telugu film cinematographers
Tamil film cinematographers
Malayalam film cinematographers
21st-century Indian photographers
Cinematographers from Tamil Nadu
Year of birth missing (living people)